Platydexia is a genus of parasitic flies in the family Tachinidae. There is one described species in Platydexia, P. maynei.

Distribution
Democratic Republic of the Congo.

References

Dexiinae
Diptera of Africa
Monotypic Brachycera genera
Tachinidae genera